Woman Up may refer to:

 "Woman Up", a song by Ashley Roberts from her 2014 album Butterfly Effect
 "Woman Up", a song by Meghan Trainor from her 2016 album Thank You